Koenigsmark, Königsmark, Koenigsmarck, or Königsmarck may refer to:

Königsmark, Saxony-Anhalt, Germany
Koenigsmark (novel), a 1918 novel by Pierre Benoit
Koenigsmark (1923 film), a film by Léonce Perret
Koenigsmark (1935 film), a British film
Koenigsmark (1953 film), a film starring Jean-Pierre Aumont
Koenigsmark (1968 film), a French television film starring Hans Meyer

People
Hans Christoff von Königsmarck (1605–1663), Swedish-German soldier
Kurt Christoph von Königsmarck (1634–1673)
Beata Elisabet von Königsmarck (1637–1723), Swedish landowner
Otto Wilhelm Königsmarck (1639–1688), Swedish general
Karl Johann von Königsmarck (1659–1686)
Maria Aurora von Königsmarck (1662–1728), Swedish noblewoman, mistress of Augustus the Strong
Amalia von Königsmarck (1663–1740), Swedish artist
Philip Christoph von Königsmarck (1665–1694), Swedish soldier
Otto von Königsmarck (1815-1889), Prussian politician
Will Koenigsmark (1896–1972), baseball player

de:Königsmarck